Miltochrista strigivenata is a moth of the family Erebidae. It was described by George Hampson in 1894. It is found in Assam, India.

References

 

strigivenata
Moths described in 1894
Moths of Asia